Ufimsky Uyezd (Уфимский уезд) was one of the subdivisions of the Ufa Governorate of the Russian Empire. It was situated in the central part of the governorate. Its administrative centre was Ufa.

Demographics
At the time of the Russian Empire Census of 1897, Ufimsky Uyezd had a population of 372,906. Of these, 61.2% spoke Russian, 30.7% Bashkir, 3.9% Tatar, 1.1% Mari, 1.0% Mordvin, 0.6% Chuvash, 0.4% Latvian, 0.3% Ukrainian, 0.2% Polish, 0.1% Udmurt, 0.1% Yiddish, 0.1% Turkmen, 0.1% German and 0.1% Belarusian as their native language.

References

 
Uezds of Ufa Governorate
Ufa Governorate